Jan Schepers (25 November 1897 – 8 March 1997) was a Dutch fencer. He competed in the team épée event at the 1936 Summer Olympics.

References

1897 births
1997 deaths
Dutch male fencers
Olympic fencers of the Netherlands
Fencers at the 1936 Summer Olympics
Sportspeople from Haarlem
20th-century Dutch people